SK Dynamo České Budějovice is a football club from České Budějovice, Czech Republic. They currently play in the Czech First League, the first tier of football in the Czech Republic.

History
The club was founded in 1899 as Sportovní kroužek České Budějovice and in 1905 as Sportovní klub České Budějovice. Since 1993, the club has played in the top-level Czech First League almost exclusively. Despite suffering relegation three times, most recently in 2005, the club has won promotion back to the top-flight immediately on each occasion.

In 2002 České Budějovice celebrated promotion to the Czech First League, announcing a project to reconstruct their stadium in line with league requirements. The club celebrated its centenary in 2005 but were relegated from the top flight, vowing to return to the Czech First League a year later. In the 2005–06 Czech 2. Liga, the club started poorly, lying in 13th place in late September. A change in fortunes came about with the club signing former player and all-time leader in national team appearances Karel Poborský on loan from Sparta Prague. The club improved significantly and went on to win promotion back to the Czech First League at the end of the season.

Since 2011, České Budějovice have had an agreement where SK Strakonice 1908 operates as its farm team.

Historical names
 1899 – SK České Budějovice (Sportovní kroužek České Budějovice)
 1903 – SK Slavia České Budějovice (Sportovní klub Slavia České Budějovice)
 1905 – SK České Budějovice (Sportovní klub České Budějovice)
 1949 – TJ Sokol JČE České Budějovice (Tělovýchovná jednota Sokol Jihočeské elektrárny České Budějovice)
 1951 – TJ Slavia České Budějovice (Tělovýchovná jednota Slavia České Budějovice)
 1953 – DSO Dynamo České Budějovice (Dobrovolná sportovní organizace Dynamo České Budějovice)
 1958 – TJ Dynamo České Budějovice (Tělovýchovná jednota Dynamo České Budějovice)
 1991 – SK Dynamo České Budějovice (Sportovní klub Dynamo České Budějovice)
 1992 – SK České Budějovice JČE (Sportovní klub České Budějovice Jihočeská energetická, a.s.)
 1999 – SK České Budějovice (Sportovní klub České Budějovice, a.s.)
 2004 – SK Dynamo České Budějovice (Sportovní klub Dynamo České Budějovice, a.s.)

Players

Current squad

Out on loan

Retired numbers
8 –  Karel Poborský, Second striker (1991–94), (2005–07)

Notable former players

Player records in the Czech First League
.
Highlighted players are in the current squad.

Most appearances

Most goals

Most clean sheets

Managers

Jiří Kotrba (1989–91)
Jindřich Dejmal (1992–93)
Pavel Tobiáš (Aug 1993 – Sept 97)
Zdeněk Procházka (1997–98)
František Cerman (1998)
Pavel Tobiáš (Aug 1998 – May 00)
Jindřich Dejmal (2000 – March 01)
Milan Bokša (March 2001–02)
Pavel Tobiáš (March 2002 – Oct 04)
Robert Žák (Oct 2004 – March 05)
František Cipro (April 2005 – Aug 07)
František Straka (July 2007 – June 08)
Jan Kmoch (June 2008 – Aug 08)
Pavel Tobiáš (July 2008 – Aug 10)
Jaroslav Šilhavý (Sept 2010 – June 11)
Jiří Kotrba (July 2011 – Sept 11)
František Cipro (Sep 2011 – Sept 12)
Miroslav Soukup (Sep 2012 – Feb 13)
Pavol Švantner (Feb 2013–13)
Pavel Hoftych (2013)
Luboš Urban (2014–15)
František Cipro (2015)
David Horejš (2015–2022)
Jozef Weber (June 2022 – Oct 22)
Jiří Lerch (Oct 2022 – Nov 2022)
Marek Nikl & Tomáš Zápotočný (Nov 2022 –)

History in domestic competitions

 Seasons spent at Level 1 of the football league system: 20
 Seasons spent at Level 2 of the football league system: 8
 Seasons spent at Level 3 of the football league system: 0
 Seasons spent at Level 4 of the football league system: 0

Czechoslovakia

Czech Republic

Honours
Czech 2. Liga (second tier)
Champions: 2001–02, 2013–14, 2018–19
Runners-up: 1998–99, 2005–06

Club records

Czech First League records
Best position: 6th (1993–94, 1996–97)
Worst position: 16th (2014–15)
Biggest home win: České Budějovice 5–0 Příbram (1999–2000)
Biggest away win: Slovácká Slavia Uherské Hradiště 0–4 České Budějovice (1995–96)
Biggest home defeat: České Budějovice 0–6 Slavia Prague (2020–21)
Biggest away defeat: Jablonec 8–0 České Budějovice (1997–98)

References

External links
 

 
Football clubs in the Czech Republic
Association football clubs established in 1905
Czechoslovak First League clubs
Czech First League clubs
1905 establishments in Austria-Hungary